Angewandte Chemie (meaning "Applied Chemistry") is a weekly peer-reviewed scientific journal that is published by Wiley-VCH on behalf of the German Chemical Society (Gesellschaft Deutscher Chemiker). Publishing formats include feature-length reviews, short highlights, research communications, minireviews, essays, book reviews, meeting reviews, correspondences, corrections, and obituaries. This journal contains review articles covering all aspects of chemistry. According to the Journal Citation Reports, the journal had a 2021 impact factor of 16.823.

Editions 
The journal appears in two editions with separate volume and page numbering: a German edition, Angewandte Chemie ( (print),  (online)), and a fully English-language edition, Angewandte Chemie International Edition ( (print),  (online)). The editions are identical in content with the exception of occasional reviews of German-language books or German translations of IUPAC recommendations.

Business model 
Angewandte Chemie is available online and in print. It is a hybrid open access journal and authors may choose to pay a fee to make articles available free of charge. Angewandte Chemie provides free access to supporting information.

Publication history 
In 1887, Ferdinand Fischer founded the Zeitschrift für die Chemische Industrie (Journal for the Chemical Industry). In 1888, the title was changed to Zeitschrift für Angewandte Chemie (Journal of Applied Chemistry), and volume numbering started over. This title was kept until the end of 1941 when it was changed to Die Chemie. Until 1920, the journal was published by Springer Verlag and by Verlag Chemie starting in 1921. Due to World War II, the journal did not publish from April 1945 to December 1946. In 1947, publication was resumed under the current title, Angewandte Chemie.

In 1962, the English-language edition was launched as Angewandte Chemie International Edition in English (CODEN ACIEAY, abbreviated as Angew. Chem. Int. Ed. Engl.), which has a separate volume counting. With the beginning of Vol. 37 (1998) "in English" was dropped from the journal name.

Several journals have merged into Angewandte, including Chemische Technik/Chemische Apparatur in 1947 and Zeitschrift für Chemie in 1990.

2020 controversy 
In June 2020, the journal withdrew a paper by Tomas Hudlicky from Brock University, "Organic synthesis—Where now?" is thirty years old. A reflection on the current state of affairs, stating that it was "accepted after peer review and appears as an Accepted Article online prior to editing, proofing, and formal publication of the final Version of Record". The paper drew opprobrium for criticizing the alleged "preferential status" of women and minorities in chemistry.

The journal withdrew the paper within hours, stating "[the ] paper contains opinions that don't reflect our values and has been removed. [...] Something went very wrong here and we're committed to do better." Additionally, 16 members of the journal's advisory board resigned on 8 June. On the same day it was reported that two editors had been suspended for passing the article. As a consequence a shaping a new version of the journal begun, with diversity, equity, and inclusion, transparency, and a continued commitment to scientific excellence as the guiding principles. A new editorial team was formed additionally. 

Hudlicky responded to the backlash and retraction stating "I stand by the views I wished to express in the essay, some of which are common knowledge, while others were duly cited from primary and secondary sources". Following a condemnation by Brock University's former vice-President, he was defended by the Canadian Association of University Teachers and Brock University Faculty Association. Subsequently, he edited and republished the article on his own website.

Impact factor 
While it has been suggested that Angewandte's impact factor is as high as it is in comparison to other chemistry journals because the journal contains reviews, the editors claim this effect is too small to explain the difference or affect the ranking of the journal in its subject group.

References 

Chemical industry in Germany
Chemistry journals
Multilingual journals
Publications established in 1887
Society of German Chemists
Wiley-VCH academic journals